The Buffalo Bandits are a lacrosse team based in Buffalo, New York playing in the National Lacrosse League (NLL). The 2018 season was their 27th season in the NLL.

Regular season

Final standings

Game log
Reference:

Roster

Entry Draft
The 2017 NLL Entry Draft took place on September 18, 2017. The Bandits made the following selections:

See also
2018 NLL season

References

Buffalo
Buffalo Bandits seasons
Buffalo Bandits